Mike Neville (baptised Michel-Joseph Neville; October 11, 1902 — January 16, 1958) was a Canadian ice hockey centreman who played three seasons in the National Hockey League for the Toronto St. Pats, and New York Americans between 1924 and 1931. The rest of his career, which lasted from 1924 to 1936, was spent in various minor leagues. He died in 1958 and was buried at Cimetière Saint-Paul de Grand-Mère, in the City of Shawinigan.

Career statistics

Regular season and playoffs

Transactions
 Signed as a free agent by the Toronto St. Pats, January 14, 1925.
 Traded by the Montreal Maroons (Windsor-IHL) with Frank Carson, Red Dutton and Hap Emms to the New York Americans for $35,000, May 14, 1930.

References

External links

1902 births
1958 deaths
Calgary Tigers players
Canadian ice hockey centres
Cleveland Indians (IHL) players
Hamilton Tigers (CPHL) players
London Tecumsehs players
New Haven Eagles players
New York Americans players
Portland Buckaroos players
Rochester Cardinals players
Ice hockey people from Toronto
Stratford Nationals players
Syracuse Stars (IHL) players
Toronto St. Pats players
Windsor Bulldogs (1929–1936) players
Windsor Bulldogs (CPHL) players